"Yakety Yak" is a song written, produced, and arranged by Jerry Leiber and Mike Stoller for the Coasters and released on Atco Records in 1958, spending seven weeks as #1 on the R&B charts and a week as number one on the Top 100 pop list. This song was one of a string of singles released by the Coasters between 1957 and 1959 that dominated the charts, making them one of the biggest performing acts of the rock and roll era.

Song
The song is a "playlet," a word Stoller used for the glimpses into teenage life that characterized the songs Leiber and Stoller wrote and produced. The lyrics describe the listing of household chores to a kid, presumably a teenager, the teenager's response ("yakety yak") and the parents' retort ("don't talk back") — an experience very familiar to a middle-class teenager of the day. Leiber has said the Coasters portrayed "a white kid’s view of a black person’s conception of white society." The serio-comic street-smart "playlets" etched out by the songwriters were sung by the Coasters with a sly clowning humor, while the tenor saxophone of King Curtis filled in, in the up-tempo doo-wop style. The group was openly "theatrical" in style—they were not pretending to be expressing their own experience.

The threatened punishment for not taking out the garbage and sweeping the floor is, in the song's humorous lyrics:
"You ain't gonna rock and roll no more,"
And the refrain is:
"Yakety yak. Don't talk back."

In the last verse, the parents order their son to tell his "hoodlum friend" outside in the car, that he won't be allowed to go out with him at all for a ride.

Personnel

 Mike Stoller, piano
 King Curtis, tenor saxophone
 Alan Hanlon, guitar
 Adolph Jacobs, guitar
 Wendell Marshall or  Lloyd Trotman, bass
 Joe Marshall, drums
 Chino Pozo, congas

Cover versions
 Québécois duo Les Jérolas recorded in 1959 a French version, subtitled "Rouspet' pas", for the RCA Victor label.
 Billy Sanders recorded a version in German, "Jackety Jack" in early 1959.
The song was covered by Jan & Dean and was planned to be released on their album Carnival of Sound in 1968. Carnival of Sound was not released until 2010.
Lee Perry released a cover version in 1969 (as Lee Perry and the Upsetters), altering the lyric "You ain't gonna rock and roll no more" to "You ain't gonna reggae reggae reggae no more"
Sha Na Na performed this as part of their set at the original Woodstock Festival and recorded two live covers of the song in 1971 and 1972.
The Pipkins covered the song in 1970, produced by John Burgess.
Electronic/disco group El Coco covered this song in 1975 with some comedy elements, taken from their debut album, Mondo Disco, released on AVI Records.
The song was covered by 2 Live Crew for the 1988 movie Twins. In the film, Julius (Arnold Schwarzenegger) sings along as the song plays in his earphones while flying to the United States.
Phantom Planet covered this song for the soundtrack of the 1999 film Mumford.

Parodies and alternate lyrics
The song was parodied for use in adverts for Radox bath soak and McCain Micro Chips in the 1980s and 1990s respectively.
A modified version, "Yakety Yak, Take It Back", was used in a 1990 all-star PSA for the Take It Back Foundation.
Vince Vance & the Valiants, one of multiple groups parodying Barbara Ann as "Bomb Iran" in 1980, created a similarly themed 2005 parody called "Yakety Yak (Bomb Iraq)".

Other uses in popular culture
 The tenor saxophone solo by King Curtis inspired the 1963 Boots Randolph song "Yakety Sax".
The song is sung by the Coasters in the 1988 horror-comedy Phantom of the Ritz, in which the four-man group makes a cameo appearance.
It has also served as the theme to Clive Anderson's chat-show Clive Anderson Talks Back during the 1990s, and as the opening theme of the 1988 movie 
It was the inspiration and theme song for the 2002-2003 Canadian/Australian animated series, Yakkity Yak.
A music video starring Plucky Duck as the kid tasked with chores, and a group of anthropomorphic yaks in police officer suits, aired on the 90th episode of Tiny Toon Adventures and used in The Plucky Duck Show.
The song name was used for the code name of Ubuntu 16.10, a Linux operating system with its versions all named after animals.
Used as the opening theme for Barstool Sports radio show The Yak.
The song is sung by Paul Bettany in a pivotal scene as Vision in the WandaVision episode "Filmed Before a Live Studio Audience".
This song was sung by caveman-clad Muppet pigs in The Muppet Show, Episode 5x13.
A commercial for Barbie Sweet Treats was sung to the tune in 1999.

The original recording was also included in films including Stand by Me (1986), The Great Outdoors (1988) and Always (1989) and the Disney+ original miniseries, WandaVision.

See also
List of number-one R&B singles of 1958 (U.S.)
List of number-one singles of 1958 (U.S.)

References

Songs written by Jerry Leiber and Mike Stoller
Jan and Dean songs
1958 singles
The Coasters songs
Billboard Top 100 number-one singles
Cashbox number-one singles
1958 songs
Atco Records singles